Saint-Sauveur-Villages is a commune in the Manche department in Normandy in north-western France. It was established on 1 January 2019 by merger of the former communes of Saint-Sauveur-Lendelin (the seat), Ancteville, Le Mesnilbus, La Ronde-Haye, Saint-Aubin-du-Perron, Saint-Michel-de-la-Pierre and Vaudrimesnil.

See also
Communes of the Manche department

References

Saintsauveurlendelin